Boletus fagicola is a fungus of the genus Boletus native to the United States. It was first described officially in 1971 by mycologists Alexander H. Smith and Harry Delbert Thiers.

See also
List of Boletus species
List of North American boletes

References

fagicola
Fungi described in 1971
Fungi of the United States
Fungi without expected TNC conservation status